2002–03 Albanian Cup was the fifty-first season of Albania's annual cup competition. It began on 30 August 2002 with the First Round and ended on 31 May 2003 with the Final match. The winners of the competition qualified for the 2003–04 first round of the UEFA Europa League. Tirana were the defending champions, having won their twelfth Albanian Cup last season. The cup was won by Dinamo Tirana.

The rounds were played in a two-legged format similar to those of European competitions. If the aggregated score was tied after both games, the team with the higher number of away goals advanced. If the number of away goals was equal in both games, the match was decided by extra time and a penalty shootout, if necessary.

First round
Games were played on 30 August – 6 September 2002.

|}

Second round
Games were played on 22 & 29 January 2003.

|}

Quarter-finals
In this round entered the 8 winners from the previous round. Games were played on 22 February – 8 March 2003.

|}

Semi-finals
In this round entered the four winners from the previous round. Games were played on 23 April – 7 May 2003.

|}

Final

References

External links
 Official website 

Cup
2002–03 domestic association football cups
2002–03